The 2015 Open de Limoges (also known as the Engie Open de Limoges for sponsorship reasons) was a professional tennis tournament played on indoor hard courts. It was the ninth edition of the tournament, and part of the 2015 WTA 125K series. It took place in Limoges, France, on 9–15 November 2015.

Singles entrants

Seeds 

 1 Rankings as of 2 November 2015

Other entrants 
The following players received wildcards into the singles main draw:
  Tessah Andrianjafitrimo
  Julie Coin
  Caroline Garcia
  Mathilde Johansson
  Elina Svitolina
  Lesia Tsurenko

The following players received entry from the qualifying draw:
  Ekaterina Alexandrova 
  Anna Blinkova
  Andrea Gámiz
  Kateryna Kozlova

The following players received entry as lucky losers:
  Barbora Krejčíková
  Mandy Minella

Withdrawals 
Before the tournament
  Kimiko Date-Krumm (left knee injury) → replaced by Barbora Krejčíková
  Lesia Tsurenko (viral illness) → replaced by Mandy Minella

Doubles entrants

Seeds

Other entrants 
The following pair received a wildcard into the doubles main draw:
  Mathilde Johansson /  Alizé Lim

Champions

Singles 

  Caroline Garcia def.  Louisa Chirico 6–1, 6–3

Doubles 

  Barbora Krejčíková /  Mandy Minella def.  Margarita Gasparyan /  Oksana Kalashnikova 1–6, 7–5, [10–6]

External links 
 Official website 

2015 WTA 125K series
2015 in French tennis
Open de Limoges